Ellen Kürti (Born Erzsébet Kürthy) was a Hungarian-born film actress known for her roles in German cinema.

Selected filmography
 The Wheels of Destiny (1923)
 Girls You Don't Marry (1924)
 Slaves of Love (1924)
 Women Who Fall by the Wayside (1925)
 Reluctant Imposter (1925)
 The Heart of a German Mother (1926)
 The Love of the Bajadere (1926)
 The Princess of the Riviera (1926)
 Assassination (1927)
 Memoirs of a Nun (1927)
 Hotel Rats (1927)
 The Dashing Archduke (1927)
 Tragedy at the Royal Circus (1928)

References

Bibliography
 Rachel A. Schildgen. More Than a Dream: Rediscovering the Life and Films of Vilma Banky. 1921 PVG Publishing, 2010.

External links

1903 births
Year of death unknown
Hungarian emigrants to Germany
Hungarian film actresses
Hungarian silent film actresses
20th-century Hungarian actresses
Actresses from Budapest